Litzirüti is a small village near Langwies, in the municipality of Arosa, canton of Graubünden, Switzerland.

The village effectively forms part of the Arosa (summer & winter) resort. The elevation is roughly 1,452 metres (4,764 ft).

There is a railway station at Litzirüti, on the Chur-Arosa railway line: Litzirüti.

The postal code is 7058.

External links
 Area website 
 Holiday house website 

Arosa
Villages in Graubünden